First Free Will Baptist Church of Pike is a historic Baptist church located at Pike, Wyoming County, New York.  It was built in 1881, and is a one-story, "L"-shaped brick building with a steep gable roof in a Late Victorian Gothic style.  It sits on a stone foundation and has a bell tower.  A baptistry was added in 1917 and a rear addition in 1926.

It was added to the National Register of Historic Places in 2012.

References

Churches on the National Register of Historic Places in New York (state)
Gothic Revival church buildings in New York (state)
Churches completed in 1881
Buildings and structures in Wyoming County, New York
National Register of Historic Places in Wyoming County, New York
1881 establishments in New York (state)